, also written as  is a resonant trans-Neptunian object from the Kuiper belt, located in the outermost region of the Solar System. It measures approximately 134 kilometers in diameter. It was discovered by astronomers at the Mauna Kea Observatory on 28 April 1998.

Description 

 is classified as a plutino, a dynamical group named after Pluto. Members of this group stay in a 2:3 resonance with Neptune.

 has the lowest, and thus bluest measured B-V color index of any TNO. On 24 May 2000,  set a TNO record low B-V of 0.51.  Reddening of the spectrum is caused by ultraviolet radiation and charged particles.  Becoming bluer in the spectrum is caused by impact collisions exposing the interior of an object.

Based on an absolute magnitude of 7.62, the Johnston's Archive estimates a diameter of 134 kilometers, assuming an albedo of 0.09.

References

External links
 2:3 Resonance
 KBO Surface Colors
 Hanging with Pluto
 

Plutinos
Discoveries by the Mauna Kea Observatories
19980428